"Pink Lemonade" is a song recorded by English singer-songwriter James Bay, from his second studio album, Electric Light (2018). The song was released by Republic Records on 7 March 2018 as the second single off the album.

In April, Bay performed the song on Late Night with Seth Meyers.

Music video
The official music video was directed by Phil Andelman and released on 26 March 2018.

The clip opens with Bay wearing a sparkling crew neck sweater while he and his band play on an Ed Sullivan Show type of broadcast playing into the living rooms of quiet suburban homes. Bay, who takes on the role as an astronaut trapped on Earth, is seen sneaking into a house's garage late at night to build a rocket ship. The highly anticipated blast off at the end of the video reveals the truth — a young Bay sitting in a “rocket” made out of a silver cardboard box, and the fantasy of escaping our planet vanishes."

Bay said “The inspiration behind the video comes from the theme of escape that runs through the song. I was reminded of a time when I was about 4 years old and I told my parents I'd had enough of living with them and would be leaving home.”

Reception
Rania Aniftos from Rolling Stone called the single “catchy” and a “delicious new rock song”.

Jon Blisten, also from Rolling Stone, said ""Pink Lemonade" marks a notable departure from both the stripped-down folk of Bay's debut album, but also the textured electronic sound of Electric Light's lead single, "Wild Love". Instead, the tune embraces a dance-rock sound reminiscent of The Strokes or Hot Hot Heat."

Track listing

Certifications

Release history

References

2018 singles
2018 songs
Republic Records singles
James Bay (singer) songs
Songs written by James Bay (singer)
Song recordings produced by Paul Epworth
Music videos directed by Philip Andelman